Eupithecia infestata is a moth in the family Geometridae first described by Charles Swinhoe in 1890. It is found in the hills of southern India.

The wingspan is about 21 mm. Adults are rather uniformly dark reddish brown.

References

Moths described in 1890
infestata
Moths of Asia